Beles River (Kusa in Gumuz language) is a river of western Ethiopia. A tributary of the Abay river (better known as the Blue Nile), the Beles rises in Dangur woreda to flow in a south-west direction to its confluence. Its catchment area amounts to about 14,200 square kilometers.

Course
The mouth of the river Beles in the Blue Nile is located about 40 km upstream of the Grand Ethiopian Renaissance dam that is under construction, and the water of the Beles will be used in the future.

Transferred water from Lake Tana 
Since the Tana Beles hydroelectric power plant has been put into operation in 2010, the Beles has received water from Lake Tana via the Tana-Beles interbasin transfer, which is to be used in a series of irrigation projects below the power plant. For this purpose a series of dams  were built.

These large water transfers from Lake Tana to Beles River affect the movement of people, the hydrogeomorphology, and ecology of the river. The Environmental Impact Assessment of the Beles hydropower project is however considered a formality and is unfindable.
The social impacts of the Tana-Beles water transfer have been studied and results published in the high-profile Journal of Hydrology: the dangerously high increases in discharge of Beles river have led to the drowning of 250 people between 2010 and 2018. The negative impacts on rural livelihoods are however overshadowed by national development goals (electricity production). The external costs (coping with damage) are borne by local people, who have low bargaining power.

See also 
 Beles Hydroelectric Power Plant

Notes 

Rivers of Ethiopia
Tributaries of the Blue Nile